Bangar-e Sofla (also Romanized as Bāngār-e Soflá) is a village in Ozgoleh Rural District, Ozgoleh District, Salas-e Babajani County, Kermanshah Province, Iran. At the 2006 census, its population was 61, in 12 families.

References 

Populated places in Salas-e Babajani County